William Patrick Donaldson (4 March 1871 – 27 March 1923) was a Scottish first-class cricketer active 1894 who played for Oxford University. He was born in Glasgow and died in Dollar, Clackmannanshire. He appeared in one first-class match.

Notes

1871 births
1923 deaths
Scottish cricketers
Oxford University cricketers
People educated at Loretto School, Musselburgh
Alumni of Brasenose College, Oxford